The Dnieper–Carpathian offensive (Russian: Днепровско-Карпатская Операция, Dneprovsko-Karpatskaya Operatsiya), also known in Soviet historical sources as the liberation of right-bank Ukraine (Russian: Освобождение Правобережной Украины, Osvobozhdeniye Pravoberezhnoy Ukrainy), was a strategic offensive executed by the Soviet 1st, 2nd, 3rd, and 4th Ukrainian Fronts, along with the 2nd Belorussian Front, against the German Army Group South, Army Group A and elements of Army Group Center, and fought from late December 1943 to early May 1944. The battles in right-bank Ukraine and in the Crimea were the most important event of the 1944 winter-spring campaign on the Eastern Front.

Consisting of a whole series of closely linked operations, the goal of this offensive was to split the Wehrmacht's Army Group South and to clear the German-Romanian-Hungarian forces from most of the Ukrainian and Moldavian territories, which were occupied by Axis forces. It was one of the biggest offensives of World War II, stretching over a 1,200 km (745 mi) front, to a 450 km depth (280 mi) and involving almost 3,500,000 troops from both sides.

In the course of the operation, 20 Wehrmacht divisions were either destroyed, disbanded or required major rebuilding, while another 60 divisions were reduced to 50% of their establishment strength. Even worse were equipment losses, with thousands of precious tanks, assault guns, artillery and trucks being lost, principally through their abandonment in the spring mud. According to German General Kurt von Tippelskirch, this was the biggest Wehrmacht defeat since Stalingrad.

As a result of this strategic offensive, Wehrmacht's Army Group South was split into two parts, north and south of the Carpathian Mountains. The northern portion was pushed back into western Galicia, while the southern portion was pushed back into Romania. The northern portion was renamed to Army Group North Ukraine, while the southern portion to Army Group South Ukraine, which was effective from 5 April 1944, although very little of Ukraine remained in German hands. It was during this offensive that the Red Army reached the June 1941 borders of the USSR, recapturing the territory seized during the 1939 Soviet invasion of Poland.

Because of the Wehrmacht defeat, the commander of Army Group South Erich von Manstein and the commander of Army Group A Ewald von Kleist were dismissed by Hitler and replaced by Walther Model and Ferdinand Schörner respectively. This offensive marked the end of Manstein's career in the Wehrmacht.

In order to save its southern sector from complete collapse, the German high command was forced to transfer 8 divisions in January- February and another 26 German divisions as reinforcements between March- May from across France, Germany, Denmark, Poland, Balkans, Army Group Centre and Army Group North to the crumbling front of Army Group South. This amounted to a total of 34 divisions,  and at least 1,200 tanks, assault guns, and self-propelled anti-tank guns.

As a result, the Soviet Dnieper–Carpathian offensive played a key role in influencing the future successes of the western Allies' Normandy landings and the Soviet Operation Bagration, as German forces stationed in France and belonging to Army Group Centre were critically weakened by the transfers. During the creation of the Kamenets-Podolsky pocket, the German forces stationed in France were deprived of 45,827 troops and 363 tanks, assault guns, and self-propelled anti-tank guns on 6 June 1944. Meanwhile, Army Group Center was deprived of a total of 125,380 troops and 552 tanks, assault guns, and self-propelled anti-tank guns on 22 June 1944.

In addition to the arrival of a large number of German reinforcements were those of Wehrmacht's Axis allies. As the Red Army approached the borders of Hungary and Romania, both countries mobilized their full resources and committed a combined total of 25 fresh divisions. 

The Soviet success during this operation led the German High Command to conclude that the southern sector of the Eastern Front would be the area where the main Soviet summer offensive of 1944 would take place.  For this reason, the German forces in the south, especially the crucial panzer divisions, received priority in reinforcements. The weakening of Army Group Centre during the Polesskoe offensive and German anticipation that the southern sector of the Eastern Front would be the place of the main Soviet summer offensive of 1944, had catastrophic consequences for the Germans during Operation Bagration.

This was the only offensive in which all 6 elite Soviet tank armies participated at the same time. Similarly, out of 30 panzer and panzer-grenadier divisions available to the Germans in late 1943, 22 were stationed in Ukraine.

Background
During the massive Battle of the Dnieper in autumn 1943, which secured the Left-bank or eastern Ukraine and cut off the German 17th Army in the Crimea, several Soviet bridgeheads were established across the right bank of the Dnieper River, which was declared to be "East Wall" by the Germans. These bridgeheads were expanded throughout November and December and became the platforms from which the Dnieper–Carpathian offensive was launched.

One of these bridgeheads centered around Kiev was up to 240 km wide and 120 km deep, and was occupied by the troops of the 1st Ukrainian Front. The other, in the region of Cherkasy, Znamenka, and Dnepropetrovsk, was up to 350 km wide and 30 to 100 km deep, and was occupied by troops of the 2nd and 3rd Ukrainian fronts.

Meanwhile, the troops of the 4th Ukrainian Front reached the lower reaches of the Dnieper in the Kakhovka-Tsyurupinsk sector, and had cut off the German 17th Army stationed in the Crimean peninsula, while also seizing a bridgehead on the southern coast of Sivash.

The troops of the North Caucasus Front (18th and 56th Armies, 4th Air Army) in early November 1943, with the assistance of the Black Sea Fleet and the Azov Flotilla, crossed the Kerch Strait and captured a bridgehead on the Kerch Peninsula.

Forces involved and their plans

Axis 
After a heavy defeat in the summer-autumn campaign of 1943, the German forces adopted a posture of strategic defense. The main line of the strategic behavior of the German forces on the Soviet-German front was stubborn defense in order to keep the occupied lines. Plans for stubborn defense on the Soviet-German front were determined by political and, most importantly, economic factors.

By holding the lines in Ukraine, the German High Command, Hitler foremost, hoped to prevent the German allies, namely Romania, Hungary and Bulgaria, from leaving the Axis military-political bloc. German General Kurt von Tippelskirch wrote the following:

"The front was rapidly approaching the Balkans. We had to fear that if events continued to develop with the same speed, Romania, Bulgaria and Hungary, despite their fear of Bolshevism, would become unreliable allies. The example of Italy was in this sense highly indicative".

The most important reason for holding the right-bank Ukraine was economic. The control of Ukraine allowed the German leadership to export food and important strategic raw materials to Germany. In their calculations for stubborn defense, the Germans attached particular importance to the retention of the right-bank Ukraine and Crimea with their rich food resources, manganese production centers around Nikopol, iron ore production centers around Krivoy Rog and Kerch, as well as the Black Sea basin with first-class seaports.

The German command took into account the important strategic position of the right bank of Ukraine and Crimea, as areas covering the approaches to southern Poland and the Balkans and ensuring control over the central and western parts of the Black Sea.

Erich von Manstein's Army Group South and Ewald von Kleist's Army Group A consisted of 2 panzer and 2 field armies (from north to south):

4th Panzer Army in the Zhitomir region, west of Kiev, commanded by Erhard Raus;
1st Panzer Army of Hans-Valentin Hube, in the Vinnitsa region and as far as Cherkassy to the south;
8th Army commanded by Otto Wöhler in the region of Kirovograd;
6th Army (recreated after its destruction at Stalingrad) under Karl-Adolf Hollidt in the Krivoy-Rog-Nikopol salient.

The German forces were also supported by the following Axis armies:

3rd Romanian Army, also rebuilt after Stalingrad, under command of Petre Dumitrescu in the Tavridia area, just north of Crimea;
4th Romanian Army hastily assembled under command of Ioan Mihail Racoviţă in the area of Soviet Moldavian Republic;
1st Hungarian Army, held in reserve in the north-western Ukraine.

All told, on the right-bank Ukraine the combined German-Romanian-Hungarian forces had a total of 93 divisions (including 18 panzer and 4 panzer-grenadier), 2 motorized brigades, 3 heavy panzer battalions of Tiger tanks, 18 StuG Assault Gun Brigades, a battalion of "Ferdinand" or Elefant tank destroyer, several anti-tank battalions,  as well as a large number of artillery, construction, engineering and other units. In general, this amounted to 40% of all German troops and 72% of all panzer divisions stationed on the Eastern Front. Army Group South was supported by the Luftwaffe's Luftflotte 4 (1st, 4th and 8th Air Corps), as well as the bulk of the Romanian Air Force. The headquarters of the Luftflotte 4 was in Proskurov, the 8th Air Corps in Vinnitsa, the 4th Air Corps in Balta, the 1st Air Corps in Pervomaisk, and the headquarters of the Romanian Air Corps in Odessa.

All along the vast front, the Germans hastily built defenses. The main defense zone with a depth of 4–6 km had a developed system of trenches, communications and various kinds of engineering barriers. On the most important directions, 6–15 km from the front line, a second line of defense was built. In the operational depth along the banks of the Goryn, Southern Bug, Ingulets, Dniester and Prut rivers, new fortifications were erected while the available fortifications were modernized.

The German forces operating on the right-bank Ukraine intended not only to keep the occupied lines, but also to try and liquidate the Soviet bridgeheads on the right bank of the Dnieper, as well as to strike from the Nikopol bridgehead to the south and from the Crimea to the north, in order to re-establish a land connection with the German forces stationed in Crimea.

By the end of 1943, the German forces operating in Ukraine were driven back to the line of Ovruch, Radomyshl, Kanev, Bashtina, Marganets, Kachachrovka. On the left bank of the Dnieper, south of Nikopol, the Germans kept a bridgehead with a depth of 30 km and a width of 120 km, which was called the "Nikopol Bridgehead".

Both Erich von Manstein and Ewald von Kleist demanded that their forces be allowed to pull back to more defensible positions, however, they were overruled by Hitler who ordered his armies to stand where they were. Despite Hitler's orders, German troops retreated anyway, often in direct disregard of orders or after submitting fictitious reports to justify their actions.

Soviet 
The Stavka committed four Fronts to the operation, with the Belorussian Front providing a strategic flank security to the north in the Gomel-Mogilev area, but taking little part in the actual operation. It included the 13th and 65th Armies. 
From north to the south, opposing 4th Panzer, 1st Panzer, 8th and 6th Armies respectively:

Nikolai Vatutin's 1st Ukrainian Front had the 60th, 1st Guards, 6th Guards Tank and 40th Armies, while also possessing significant armored reserves in the 3rd Guards Army and the 1st and 4th Tank Armies, backed up by the 18th and 38th Armies and the 2nd Air Army.

Ivan Konev's 2nd Ukrainian Front to the south led with the 27th, 7th Guards and 53rd Armies, with reserves including the 5th Guards Tank and 2nd Guards Tank armies, and the 4th Guards Army, all supported by the 5th Air Army.

Rodion Malinovsky's 3rd Ukrainian Front had the 57th, 46th, 8th Guards and 37th armies leading his front, with the 6th Army in reserve, and the 17th Air Army providing air support.

Fyodor Tolbukhin's 4th Ukrainian Front would have the most difficult job in conducting combined operations of his Separate Coastal Army and the Black Sea Fleet while the 5th and 2nd Guards armies would cut off escape routes over land for the German 17th Army with air support from the 8th Air Army and the Black Sea Fleet naval aviation.

In accordance with the general military-political task of completely clearing the Soviet land from the German forces and restoring the USSR's state borders from the Barents Sea to the Black Sea, the Soviet Supreme Command, Stavka, for the winter of 1943/44 planned a series of major offensive operations- near Leningrad and Novgorod, in Belarus, on the right-bank Ukraine and in the Crimea.

In the upcoming winter offensive, the main efforts of the Red Army forces were concentrated in the south with the task of liberating right-Bank Ukraine and Crimea. This would ensure the defeat of the largest strategic grouping of the Germans (Army Group South), the return to the Soviet control of economically important areas of Krivoy Rog, Kerch, Nikopol, the fertile lands of Ukraine and Crimea, first-class ports of the Black Sea, as well as the creation of necessary conditions for a further attack on the Balkans, Poland and towards the flank of Army Group Center, operating in Belarus.

To fulfill the goals, the Soviet command utilized the troops of the 1st, 2nd, 3rd and 4th Ukrainian fronts, Separate Coastal Army, the Black Sea Fleet, the Azov Flotilla, as well as the partisans operating in the rear of the Germans.
According to the plan, which was formed by December 1943, the 1st Ukrainian Front was to crush the north wing of Army Group South by a blow from Kiev to Mogilev-Podolsky. At the same time, the 2nd, 3rd and 4th Ukrainian fronts with blows from the north, east and south were supposed to surround and destroy the Krivoi Rog-Nikopol group of the Germans. At the end of December 1943, the situation prevailing in Ukraine made it necessary to change this plan somewhat. Instead of a deep blow to the south, in the direction of Kazanka, Bereznegovatoye, the 2nd Ukrainian Front had to attack with the main forces towards Kirovograd, Pervomaisk.

In early January 1944, the plan for the actions of the Red Army troops was reduced in general terms to the following. The 1st Ukrainian Front would launch the main attack on Vinnitsa, Mogilev-Podolsky, with part of the forces being directed towards Lutsk and Khristinovka. The 2nd Ukrainian Front would launch the main attack on Kirovograd, Pervomaisk, with part of the forces being also directed towards Khristinovka, These combined Soviet offensives were to shatter the main forces of Army Group South, after which the Red Army would advance towards the Carpathian Mountains, thereby leading to a split of Army Group South. The actions of these fronts were coordinated by the Stavka representative Marshal of the Soviet Union G.K. Zhukov.

The troops of the 3rd and 4th Ukrainian fronts would struck two converging blows in the directions of Nikopol, Novo-Vorontsovka and were to defeat the Nikopol-Krivoi Rog grouping of the Germans, then to develop an attack towards Nikolaev, Odessa and free the entire Black Sea coast. At the same time, the 4th Ukrainian Front was only initially engaged for joint actions with the 3rd Ukrainian Front to defeat the Germans in the Nikopol area- subsequently, the front switched to defeating the enemy in Crimea, together with the Separate Coastal Army, the Black Sea Fleet and the Azov military flotilla. The actions of the 3rd and 4th Ukrainian Fronts were coordinated by the STAVKA representative Marshal of the Soviet Union A. M. Vasilevsky.

Such a sequence was envisaged in solving the tasks: first, defeat the Germans in the areas adjacent to the Dnieper, and throw them back to the line of the Southern Bug river, Pervomaisk, Ingulets river. In the future, to develop an offensive to the west and southwest, reach the line of Lutsk, Mogilev-Podolsky and the Dniester river.

The beginning of the operation to liberate Crimea was made dependent on the liquidation of the Nikopol-Krivoy Rog grouping of the Germans. Then, however, the deteriorating weather conditions in Crimea forced the beginning of this operation to be postponed until April.

The Soviet partisans were given the task of strengthening the attacks on German communications, road junctions, crossings, their rear garrisons, thereby assisting the Red Army.

All told, at the start of January 1944 the 4 Soviet Ukrainian Fronts (1st, 2nd, 3rd, and 4th Ukrainian Fronts) had a total of 21 combined-arms armies, 3 tank armies and 4 air armies- a total of 169 rifle divisions, 9 cavalry divisions, 18 tank and mechanized corps, 31,530 guns and mortars, 1,908 tanks and self-propelled artillery installations, 2,364 combat aircraft.

Retained Soviet bridgeheads on the right bank of the Dnieper were the starting areas for the concentration of troops, military equipment, materiel needed for the impending offensive. In early December 1943, the Soviets began to regroup the troops. At night rifle divisions, artillery and tank units marched to the front line. A continuous stream of moving vehicles with weapons, military equipment, ammunition and food arrived to the front.

The territory of the right-bank Ukraine 
The hostilities that unfolded in January–May 1944 in the southern section of the Soviet-German front covered a vast territory from the Dnieper to the Carpathians, from Polesia to the Black Sea, including the right-bank Ukraine, Western Ukraine, Southern Ukraine, Crimea, part of Moldova and Romania.

The terrain in the combat areas was very diverse, ranging from vast wooded swampy areas, endless steppes, to mountains and hills. On the right-bank Ukraine there are many rivers flowing mainly from the northwest to the southeast: for example, the Dnieper, Southern Bug, Ingulets, Dniester, Prut and Siret. Those rivers were serious natural barriers for the advancing Red Army troops that could be used by the Germans to organize defense. In general, the vast territory of the right-bank Ukraine allowed the Soviets to launch broad offensive operations and use all types of troops, including large armored and mechanized formations.

Right-bank Ukraine makes up more than half of the territory of all Ukraine and is of extreme economic importance. There are many large administrative and industrial centers such as Odessa, Dnepropetrovsk, Krivoy Rog, Nikolaev, Kirovograd, Vinnitsa.

In the areas of the right-bank Ukraine, important industries were developed: iron ore (Krivoy Rog), manganese ore (Nikopol), oil extracting (Drohobych district), shipbuilding (Nikolaev), sugar, textile and other industries. Wheat, sugar beet, maize, rye, and barley are grown on the territory of the right-bank Ukraine. Cattle breeding is well developed in the Polesie regions, while horticulture is well developed in the central and southern regions. Crimea is a horticulture and viticulture district. The iron ore development of the Kerch Peninsula is important. In the Crimea there are 4 large ports: Sevastopol, Feodosiya, Kerch, Yevpatoria.

The capture of the right-bank Ukraine and the Crimea would open the doors for the Red Army troops to Poland, Slovakia, Romania and the Balkans. It would also ensure the domination of the Soviet Black Sea Fleet in the Central and Western parts of the Black Sea.

Weather and its effect on combat operations 
One of the defining features of the Dnieper-Carpathian Offensive is the weather, which had a major impact on combat operations. 

Compared to previous winters on the Eastern Front, the winter of 1943-1944 in Ukraine was unusually warm. During the winter of 1941-1942 around Moscow, the temperatures reached as low -40°C. Meanwhile, during the winter 1942-1943 Soviet offensives in southern Russia, after the German 6th Army was destroyed at Stalingrad, the temperatures reached at least as low as -20°C.

In 1944, spring in Ukraine was early. Already in January 1944, melting of the snow began, the wet snow was soon followed by rain. In February, there were frosts and snowstorms in places, but not for long, then it got warmer again by the end of the month. For 10 days in the period from 27 January to 18 February 1944, there were constant rains and wet snowfalls, for 5 days there were no precipitation, while the rest of the days there were snowfalls. Daily mean temperature in Ukraine during this period ranged from -5.5°C to +4.9°C. The rivers became flooded, the roads became very muddy, the terrain outside roads became difficult to pass. 

Alexander Werth, a British journalist and wartime correspondent, who was with the 2nd Ukrainian Front at the time, described what he saw in Ukraine in the spring of 1944: 

"The Ukrainian mud in spring has to be seen to be believed. The whole country is swamped, and the roads are like rivers of mud, often two feet deep, with deep holes to add to the difficulty of driving any kind of vehicle, except a Russian T- 34 tank. Most of the German tanks could not cope with it."  

The flooded rivers became serious obstacle for both sides. For the Germans attempting to break out of Korsun Pocket in February 1944, the last obstacle was the Gniloy Tikich shallow river. Usually, in the hot summer the river was no bigger than a brook that can be easily forded, but in February 1944, after a three-week thaw, the Gniloy Tikich flooded to a width of 20-30 meters. The river was transformed into a fast flowing river, deeper than a person's height. It was a serious obstacle for the encircled German units that had lost their engineering equipment, as there was no bridge or fishing boat on the river. The banks of the Gniloy Tikich became a grave for thousands of German soldiers. Soon Soviet tanks approached the river and their shots began to pierce gaps in the ranks of the Germans who had gathered on its banks. The retreat turned into a disorderly flight. German soldiers threw themselves into the icy water, trying to swim across the river, and many drowned  or succumbed to frostbite .

All this sharply reduced the maneuverability of the troops of both sides, especially the Soviet troops that were on continuous advance with supply bases being over 300 km behind. It also limited the use of tanks and artillery, and hampered the supply of food, fuel and ammunition. In connection with the spring thaw, most of the ground airfields were no longer usable, which complicated the deployment and usage of aviation.

However, much to the disappointment of the Germans, the Red Army continued their offensives, becoming the only force in the history of warfare that was able to launch large-scale and successful offensives in the conditions of the spring mud (rasputitsa) and amid flooded rivers.

Battle

First phase 
The initial phase of the offensive, it lasted from 24 December 1943, to 29 February 1944. It included the following operations:

Zhitomir–Berdichev Offensive (24 December 1943 – 14 January 1944);
Kirovograd Offensive (5–16 January 1944);
Korsun–Shevchenkovsky Offensive (24 January 1944 – 17 February 1944);
Rovno–Lutsk Offensive (27 January 1944 – 11 February 1944);
Nikopol–Krivoi Rog Offensive (30 January 1944 – 29 February 1944).

Zhitomir–Berdichev offensive

The offensive was launched on December 24, 1943, by General Nikolai Vatutin's 1st Ukrainian Front, with attacks against the German 4th Panzer Army, to the west and south-west of Kiev. Manstein attempted to counter the attack with a flank attack by the Fourth Panzer Army, while simultaneously requesting reinforcements and permission to shorten the line by withdrawing.  Vatutin's offensive continued west, and the Fortieth Army passed south of Fastov. Manstein's attempted counterattack failed when Erhard Raus, the commander of the Fourth Panzer Army, said that he did not have time to organize for an offensive and preferred to attempt to directly stop the attacking troops. On December 27, Manstein directly asked Hitler for permission to pull back his troops, but he was ordered to hold. Soviet troops attacked Kazatin on December 28. After several hours of confused fighting, Soviet forces captured the town later that day. Korosten fell on December 29, and Zhitomir followed on December 31. The Fourth Panzer Army began to fall apart, as a 35-mile gap opened around Zhitomir between its southern flank and the XIII Corps. Another gap developed between the XXXXII Corps and VII Corps. Raus advised Manstein to forgo attempts to close the gaps, and instead focus on keeping the remaining Corps intact. Around the time of the new year, however, Soviet forces began an attempt to encircle German forces, particularly the XIII, XXXXVIII, and XXIV Panzer Corps. As attacks on areas surrounding Berdichev continued, the XIII Corps was reduced to the strength of one infantry regiment. A gap of almost 70 miles was opened between Fourth Panzer Army and the First Panzer Army. Planned German reinforcements were stopped by the Soviet Kirovograd offensive.

In the course of the operation the Soviets achieved notable success. Having advanced to a depth of 80 to 200 km, they almost completely cleared the German forces from the Kiev and Zhytomyr regions, a number of districts of the Vinnitsa and Rovno regions. The Soviets now dangerously hanged from the north over Army Group South, while the 27th and 40th Armies had deeply enveloped the German troops that continued to hold the right bank of the Dnieper in the area of Kanev. This created the conditions for the subsequent Korsun-Schevchenkovsky Operation.

The blow of the 1st Ukrainian Front was struck at the most sensitive place of Army Group South – its northern flank, which threatened to cut off its main forces from the paths leading to Germany. The 1st and 4th Panzer Armies operating in the front line had suffered serious losses- the 143rd and 147th Reserve Infantry Divisions were disbanded, the 68th Infantry Division due to heavy losses was withdrawn from the front-line and sent to Poland for extensive refits, while 8th Panzer Division, 20th Panzer-Grenadier Division, 112th, 291st and 340th Infantry Divisions were halved in strength. All told, 8 Wehrmacht divisions were either destroyed or halved in strength.

To close the gaps in their defense and to stop the Soviet offensive on this sector, the Germans had to urgently transfer 12 divisions of the 1st Panzer Army from the southern Ukraine to this area. The reserves turned out to be almost completely spent, which affected the further course of operations. To parry the subsequent attacks of the Soviet troops, the German command was forced to deploy troops from Western Europe, as well as from Romania, Hungary, Yugoslavia.

Kirovograd offensive

General Ivan Konev's 2nd Ukrainian Front next joined the fray by launching the Kirovograd offensive on January 5, 1944. One of the first accomplishments was to stop III Panzer Corps' attempted reinforcement of the Fourth Panzer Army, which was simultaneously being attacked by Vatutin's Front in the Zhitomir–Berdichev offensive. At this point, Manstein flew to Hitler's headquarters in East Prussia to ask permission to withdraw, but was again refused.

As a result of the Kirovograd operation, the troops of the 2nd Ukrainian Front pushed back the Germans from the Dnieper 40–50 km. During intense battles, the German 8th Army suffered significant losses- the 167th Infantry Division was disbanded due to heavy losses, while the 10th Panzer-Grenadier Division, 106th, 282nd and 376th infantry divisions suffered 50 to 75% losses in personnel and lost a large number of equipment.

The most important result of the operation was the liberation of Kirovograd – a major stronghold and an important road junction, which broke the stability of the defense of the 8th German Army. The capture of Kirovograd threatened from the south the flanks of German forces which were located around Korsun-Schevchenkovsky. In turn, the Kirovograd Operation, alongside the neighboring Zhitomir-Berdichev Operation, created the conditions for the subsequent Korsun-Schevchenkovsky Operation.

Korsun–Shevchenkovsky offensive

The main effort was to the south, where the Korsun–Shevchenkovsky offensive was launched on January 24. After a massive bombardment, 2nd Ukrainian Front's 4th Guards and 53rd Armies attacked to the south of the Korsun bulge, and were joined the next day by the 5th Guards Tank Army. They broke through and easily repelled a German counter-attack. On January 26, 1st Ukrainian Front dispatched 6th Guards Tank Army from the north, which met up with the forces advancing from the south on January 28, encircling about 60,000 Germans in XI and XXXXII Army Corps around Korsun, in a pocket named "Little Stalingrad" due to the ferocity of the fighting in it. In total, twenty-seven Soviet divisions were assigned to destroy the pocket. Soviet efforts, however, were hindered by the onset of an early thaw, which made the ground muddy. On February 4 Manstein dispatched Hans Hube, commanding the 1st Panzer Army, including XLVII and III Panzer Corps to assist in a breakout attempt. XLVII Panzer Corps attacked from the south-east, while III Panzer Corps attacked the west, but they were both bogged down by the mud. Zhukov issued a surrender demand to the forces trapped in the pocket on February 8, but was turned down. III Panzer Corps was eventually, after a hard battle of attrition, able to reach Lysyanka, close to the trapped forces, and German forces in the pocket attempted to break out, with a majority perhaps escaping, albeit with heavy losses in abandoned wounded and heavy equipment. Running out of supplies and harried by airstrikes and advancing ground forces, Wilhelm Stemmermann, commander of the trapped forces, decided to attempt a final break-out on the night of February 16–17. The Soviets took approximately 15,000 prisoners, and killed at least 10,000 Germans, including Stemmermann. The battle was waged under incredibly brutal conditions, with Russian POWs shot by the Germans during the retreat, and Konev admitted to allowing his cavalry to massacre troops attempting surrender with upraised hands.

Rovno–Lutsk offensive

Vatutin's forces continued attacking on the right flank, coming near to the important supply centers of Lvov and Ternopol in the Rovno–Lutsk Offensive, which opened a 110-mile gap between Army Group South and Army Group Center, which was stationed to the north.

Nikopol–Krivoi Rog offensive

The Nikopol–Krivoi Rog offensive was meanwhile launched by 3rd Ukrainian Front to the south against forces in Paul Ludwig Ewald von Kleist's Army Group A, and proceeded slowly at first. However, it eventually destroyed the salient projecting around Kryvyi Rih and Nikopol, costing the Germans the important mining operations there as well as nearly encircling the defenders.

While the offensive appeared to slow down in late February, the Soviets were preparing for the second phase of the offensive, soon to be launched on an even larger scale.

Second phase
These operations were included in the second phase by Soviet planners:

Proskurov–Chernovtsy offensive (4 March 1944 – 17 April 1944);
Uman–Botoşani offensive (5 March 1944 – 17 April 1944);
Bereznegovatoye–Snigirevka offensive (6–18 March 1944);
Polesskoe offensive (15–5 April 1944);
Odessa offensive (26 March 1944 – 14 April 1944).

Proskurov–Chernovtsy offensive

This was the biggest and most important Soviet operation of the Dnieper–Carpathian offensive. After the slackening of the Soviet effort at the end of February, the OKH, the headquarters for the Eastern Front, believed any further offensive effort in that sector unlikely. However, the Soviets were secretly preparing an even greater offensive, bringing in all six tank armies stationed in Ukraine. The Soviet deception measures were successful and most Germans were surprised when, on March 4, the 1st Ukrainian Front–commanded by Marshal Georgy Zhukov after Vatutin's death–launched the Proskurov–Chernovtsy offensive (see Kamenets-Podolsky pocket), with a fierce artillery barrage. Due to the extremely muddy conditions, it was hard for the defending Germans to remain mobile, but the Soviet forces had adequate supplies of tracked tanks and trucks, giving them the advantage.

Uman–Botoshany offensive

On March 5 Koniev launched the Uman–Botoshany offensive, advancing rapidly and soon cutting off the supply line for First Panzer Army by capturing Chortkov on March 23. On March 10, the 2nd Ukrainian Front destroyed two Panzer Corps by capturing them at the fall of Uman.

Bereznegovatoye–Snigirevka offensive

Malinovsky joined with the Bereznegovatoye–Snigirevka offensive the next day, while Tolbukin was detached to begin preparations for the Crimean offensive. These Fronts advanced rapidly, while Konev moved to cut off the withdrawal of the First Panzer Army. The First Panzer Army, now commanded by Hans Hube, was entirely encircled by March 28. During the encirclement, Eric von Manstein flew to Hitler's headquarters and asked him to revoke his directive that required all encircled formations to form "fortresses" where they were. He was successful, and received II SS Panzer Corps as reinforcements, the first transfer of forces to the Eastern Front at the expense of the Western Front since Hitler's Führer Directive 51. On March 30, Hube's forces struck out of the pocket, and, because Soviet military intelligence was unaware of the arrival of II Panzer Corps and he moved west, instead of south as Soviet commanders were expecting, he was successful, and, by April 10, Hube's forces had met up with the Fourth Panzer Army. Despite this small success, Hitler blamed his generals for the overall strategic success of Soviet forces, fired the commanders of Army Group South and Army Group A (von Manstein and von Kleist, respectively), replaced them with Walter Model and Ferdinand Schörner, and renamed them Army Groups North and South Ukraine, indicating his plans to recapture this territory.

Polesskoe offensive

Meanwhile, towards the south, the 3rd Ukrainian Front was advancing on Odessa and into the Romanian-administered Transnistria. After three days of heavy fighting, his spearheading Eight Guards Army had advanced only , but it had broken the crust of Karl-Adolf Hollidt's Sixth Army, and quickly advanced  towards Novyi Buh, nearly encircling the defenders. Despite Hitler's orders forbidding retreat, German forces fell back to the Bug River by March 11. The same day, Hollidt managed to break out from his encirclement – primarily because Malinovsky had divided his forces at Mykolaiv (Nikolaev) – and was able to improvise a defensive line on the Bug by March 21. However, he had lost Hitler's confidence, and was sacked, to be replaced with Maximilian de Angelis. On March 28, pressed hard all over the line, German troops began to fall back from the Bug.

Odessa offensive

By March 25, the Prut had fallen and the 3rd Ukrainian Front was dispatched to secure Odessa. On April 2, Vasili Chuikov's Eighth Guards Army and Forty-Sixty Army attacked through a blizzard and, by April 6, had driven the defenders past the Dniester River and isolated Odessa. Odessa capitulated on April 10, and Soviet troops began entering Romania proper.

Aftermath
The battles on the right-bank Ukraine and in the Crimea were the most important events of the 1944 winter-spring campaign on the Eastern Front and were of the greatest political, economic and strategic importance.

Between late December 1943– early May 1944, the Red Army troops defeated the strongest German force on the territory of the right-bank, western and southern Ukraine, which was Army Group South and Army Group A, and forced the battered army groups to retreat 250–450 km to the west, into eastern Poland (Galicia) and Romania.

The defeat of Army Group South and Army Group A, and the clearing of the German forces from the Right-Bank Ukraine and Crimea had radically changed the strategic situation in the south. With the Red Army capturing the Lvov-Odessa railway, the main supply lifeline of Army Group South, and reaching the Carpathian Mountains, the front of Army Group South was split into two parts- north and south of the Carpathians. The northern portion was pushed back into Galicia (Poland), while the southern portion was pushed back into Romania.

The northern portion was renamed to Army Group North Ukraine, while the southern portion to Army Group South Ukraine, which was effective from 5 April 1944, although very little of Ukraine remained in German hands. As a result of this split, the connection between these two new army groups had been broken. Now, the southern group of German forces would have to use the long roundabout route through the Balkans, with all of the supplies being rerouted over the Romanian railroads, which were in poor condition.

For the German forces deployed in Ukraine, the personnel losses were significant. During the campaign, 9 infantry and 1 Luftwaffe field division were destroyed, while 7 panzer and panzergrenadier, 1 parachute, and 2 infantry divisions were so badly damaged that they were withdrawn from the front and sent to the West for extensive refits. Nearly all the rest of the divisions were heavily damaged as well, suffering at least 50% losses in personnel, while some were left with just remnants of their troops. For instance, 18 of the 39 divisions belonging to Army Group A were categorized as Kampfgruppen, or battle groups, meaning that the divisions were so depleted as to actually be the equivalent of little more than reinforced regiments.

According to German General Kurt von Tippelskirch, the defeat of the German forces on the Right-bank Ukraine was the biggest since Stalingrad: "Since the time when the German armies followed a thorny path from the Volga and the Caucasus, retreating to the Dnieper, this was their biggest defeat. Even such skilled generals as Manstein and Kleist could not save the German troops."

In Crimea, during the April–May 1944 Crimean offensive, the German 17th Army was annihilated. The 5 German and 7 Romanian divisions that were part of it were largely destroyed.

In reaction to the German defeat, Hitler took repressive measures against the senior command. The commander of Army Group South Erich von Manstein and the commander of Army Group A Ewald von Kleist were dismissed by Hitler and replaced by Walther Model and Ferdinand Schörner respectively. Many commanders of corps, divisions and commandants of the "fortresses" were removed from their posts and put on trial. Thousands of middle and junior officers have been convicted by military courts.

With a crushing blows between January and May 1944, the Red Army thwarted the intentions of the German command to wage a protracted defensive war and overturned all attempts by the Germans to create a stable defense on the southern part of the Soviet-German front.

The huge losses of the German troops significantly shook the stability of the German defenses on the entire Soviet-German front, weakening the forces of the neighboring Army Group Center, as well as weakening the German forces stationed in France prior to the opening of the second front in Europe.

The Dnieper–Carpathian offensive had a major impact upon the future course of events during the summer of 1944 in the East and West. In essence, the battle turned out to be a huge bloodsucker that absorbed huge amounts of German resources from across France, Germany, Denmark, Poland, Balkans and Army Group Center. All told, between January–May 1944, a total of 34 divisions, 550,000 men and 853 tanks, assault guns, and self-propelled anti-tank guns were transferred to Ukraine from across Europe and Army Group Center.

To deal with the crises and to stabilize the front-lines in the Western Ukraine, the Wehrmacht was forced to redirect huge amounts of men, equipment, and reinforcements to that area. These resources were desperately necessary to prepare the forces in France for the upcoming Allied invasion and whose redirection critically weakened Army Group Center.

This Soviet offensive also ended any prospects the Germans may had about creating a sizable strategic reserve, since most of the German reserves were exhausted in this battle. In turn, this set the Wehrmacht up for a new series of even greater disasters in the summer of 1944. While German defeat was inevitable at this point in the war, the Soviet success during this offensive had sped up the process of the eventual Allied victory and saved the Allies a great deal of time, blood, and treasure.

The Soviet success during this offensive created the conditions for a series of major offensives in the summer of 1944. First, conditions were created to develop attacks in the Lublin direction to the flank and rear of Army Group Center, which were accomplished during the Lublin–Brest offensive. Secondly, conditions were created to develop attack in the Lvov direction and towards eastern Poland, which was accomplished during the Lvov–Sandomierz offensive. Thirdly, conditions were created to develop attack deeper into Romania and the Balkans, which were accomplished during the second Jassy–Kishinev offensive.

The operation, along with the Crimean offensive, resulted in very heavy casualties for the unmotorized Romanian troops stationed in Ukraine. The heavy casualties and the proximity of Soviet forces to the Romanian border were the primary motivations for Romanian leaders when they began secret peace talks in Moscow soon after the completion of the offensive.

Territory recaptured
In the course of the operation the Vinnytsia (Vinnitsa), Volyn, Zhytomyr (Zhytomir), Kiev, Kirovohrad, Rivne (Rovno), Khmelnytskyi (Khmelnitskiy) and parts of Poltava Oblasts, and the Moldavian Soviet Socialist Republic were taken by the Red Army.

Modern view
During the Cold War the operation was not very widely recognized for the significant strategic victory that it really is in Western history.  After the end of World War II, some of the commanders involved were disgraced, and Stalin widely eliminated most references of the operation. Also, under the influence of German historiography and biographies, Western historians until the end of the Cold War focused on the German successes in the extrication of the 1st Panzer Army instead of the Soviet operations themselves that liberated much of Ukraine.

References

Sources

 

Conflicts in 1943
Conflicts in 1944
Battles and operations of the Soviet–German War
Battles and operations of World War II involving Czechoslovakia
Military operations of World War II involving Germany
Military history of Ukraine
Strategic operations of the Red Army in World War II
1943 in Ukraine
1944 in Ukraine